The Ngaanyatjarra, also known (along with the Pini) as the Nana, are an Indigenous Australian cultural group of Western Australia. They are located in the Goldfields-Esperance region, as well as Northern Territory.

Language
Ngaanyatjarra is a Western Desert language belonging to the Wati branch of the Pama-Nyungan languages. Ngaanya literally means "this" (that is, the demonstrative pronoun) and -tjarra means "with/having" (the comitative suffix); the compound term means "those that use 'ngaanya' to say 'this'". The neighbouring Ngaatjatjarra use ngaatja  for "this". Many Ngaanyatjarra are multilingual, not only speaking English but also a number of other dialects in the area.

Country
Ngaanyatjarra lands cover roughly 3% of the Australian landscape, a territory as large as that of the United Kingdom. The neighbouring tribes are the Martu and the Pitjantjatjara. They extend through parts of the North Western and Little Great and Little Sandy Deserts, the southeast Gascoyne region, the Gibson Desert, the Central Central Great Victoria Desert and the Western Central Ranges.

Local government

The associated Ngaanyatjarra Council operates various services for the communities.

There are 10 small local centres within the Ngaanyatyarra Lands:

 Irrunytju (Wingellina)
 Papulankutja (Blackstone)
 Mantamaru (Jameson)
 Warburton
 Wanarn
 Warakurna
 Tjukurla
 Tjirrkarli
 Patjarr
 Kanpa

Kiwirrkurra and Yilka (Cosmo Newbery) lie outside the Lands, but are served by the Shire.

Time zones
The lands operate on two time zones: Yilka/Cosmo, Mantamaru/Jameson, Patjarr, Tjirrkarli, Wanarn and Warburton use Australian Western Standard Time (AWST), while Blackstone, Kiwirrkurra, Tjukurla, Warakurna, and Irrunytju/Wingellina are on Australian Central Standard Time.

People and society
The area inhabited by the Ngaanyatjarra people (yarnangu) has a record of human habitation going back some 10,000 years. In traditional society, the Ngaanyatjarra comprised numerous bands, usually constituted by a group of a dozen people. Males only reached marriageable age at around 30, after a thorough training and graduation through a complex initiatory system, that transformed tjilku (male children) into wati (men). Passage to this status was marked by the right to wear a red headband, though as post-initiates (tjawarratja) they were still required to dwell apart from the main camp as elders continued to instruct them. Learning the lore required that the initiates had to supply their elders with foodstuffs like meat, a scarce resource in the area. In this sense, the tjukurrpa system also functioned as a cross-generational mode of exacting obedience and an income from the younger men. Females entered into wedlock just after the onset of puberty. Ceremonial induction consisted of learning to absorb the complex details of tjukurrpa, namely the lore/law of the dreamtime. The process is graded so that full knowledge only comes after 50 the normal age after which one can begin gain recognition as a wati yirna or tjilpi, a thoroughly knowledgeable elder, though even 60-year-olds can still be denied that recognition.

The Ngaanyatjarra had a moiety system divided into sun-side (Tjirntulukultul(pa)) and shade-side (Ngumpalurrungkatja), with a 6 section classification.

Sun-side
 Tjarurru men have Purungu children as the offspring of marriage to either Panaka or Yiparrka women
 Panaka men marry only Tjarurru women, producing Karimarra offspring
 Yiparrka men marrying a Tjarurru women have Milangka offspring

Shade-side
 Purungu men have Tjarurru through marriage to either Karimarra or Milangka women.
 Karimarra men only marry Purungu women to have Panaka children
 Milangka men marry Purungu women and produce Yiparrka children.

Estimates of the number of Ngaanyatjarra range from 1,600, referring to permanent residents and 2,700, including a more mobile people of Ngaanyatjarra descent, who often visit the area. Though life is generally peaceful, the adaptation to modern society has produced considerable trauma and alienation, as the genealogical continuity of family structures has suffered disruption from numerous accidents or family violence, including sexual abuse and assault, and suicide. The area is "dry" meaning that the destructive effects of excessive alcoholic consumption are not in evidence throughout their communities, and longevity has been a characteristic of the people. However, incarceration rates, predominantly for offences of sexual or domestic violence or reckless driving, are high, 14 times higher than the non-indigenous rate. Ngaanyatjarra councils have lobbied, with some success, to get more police stationed in their areas to address the problem.

History of contact
Until the establishment of the Warburton Mission in 1934 there had been no external agency established on their lands. Until the 1960s, contact with the outside world had been sparse and relatively benign, with none of the disruption of displacement from their traditional terrain typically suffered by Aborigines generally. The mission sowed the seeds of Christian culture which continues to this day, particularly in the form of charismatic evangelism.

Native title

People
 Tjapartji Kanytjuri Bates (1933–2015), artist

See also
 Aboriginal groupings of Western Australia

Notes

Citations

Sources

External links
General information on the region:
 Ngaanyatjarra Shire Council website
 Ngaanyatjarra Media website

Arts Organisations Websites:
 Wilurarra Creative website
 Warakurna Artists website
 Papulankutja Artists website
 Kayili Artists website
 Tjarlirli Art website
 Tjanpi Desert Weavers website

Aboriginal peoples of the Northern Territory
Aboriginal peoples of Western Australia
Goldfields-Esperance